H. monstrosus may refer to:
 Hemiandrus monstrosus, a synonym for Anisoura nicobarica, the Northland tusked weta, an insect species endemic to New Zealand
 Homo monstrosus, a synonym for Homo sapiens
 Hypsignathus monstrosus, the hammer-headed bat or big-lipped bat, a bat species widely distributed in equatorial Africa

See also
 Monstrosus (disambiguation)